Sergio Magistrelli (born 11 November 1951 in Sedriano) is an Italian former professional footballer who played as a forward. He played in Serie A for Atalanta, Inter and Sampdoria.

Honours

Individual
 Coppa Italia top scorer: 1975–76 (7 goals).

References

1951 births
Living people
Footballers from Lombardy
Italian footballers
Association football forwards
Serie A players
Serie B players
Como 1907 players
Atalanta B.C. players
Inter Milan players
Palermo F.C. players
U.C. Sampdoria players
U.S. Lecce players